The Palais Quartier, formerly known as FrankfurtHochVier, is a building complex in the Innenstadt district of Frankfurt, Germany. It was built from 2004 to 2011.

The complex consists of four buildings:
 MyZeil, a shopping mall
 Palais Thurn und Taxis, a reconstruction of a palace from 1793 which had been badly damaged in World War II
 Nextower, a -high rise office building
 Jumeirah Frankfurt, a -high rise hotel building

Beneath the complex lies the largest underground car park in Frankfurts city centre with 1,396 parking positions.

Location 
Palais Quartier is located on a  area between Frankfurts main shopping street, the Zeil, and the historic Eschenheim Tower.

History 
The site had been used for decades by Deutsche Post as the main post office in Frankfurt. It was sold to an investor in 2002 and plans were made for a new building complex including a large shopping mall because the site borders the Zeil, Frankfurts top-selling shopping street. The demolition of the old post buildings, including one of Frankfurts first high rise buildings, the -high Fernmeldehochhaus, began in 2004, but legal disputes delayed the construction works for several months.

See also 
 List of tallest buildings in Frankfurt
 List of tallest buildings in Germany
 MyZeil
 Palais Thurn und Taxis

External links 

Buildings and structures in Frankfurt
Skyscrapers in Frankfurt
Buildings and structures completed in 2009
Frankfurt-Altstadt
Skyscraper office buildings in Germany
Skyscraper hotels in Germany